Rajendran Absolem Christie (1 July 1938 – 22 December 1992) was an Indian former field hockey player. He was the goalkeeper of the Indian hockey team that won the gold medal in the 1964 Summer Olympics at Tokyo, Japan, and the bronze medal in the 1968 Summer Olympics at Mexico City, Mexico. They also won the silver medal in the 1962 Asian Games at Jakarta, Indonesia.

Christy was an alumnus of Bangalore Military School. As a mark of respect, the school Hockey ground was named after him. He died on 22 December 1992 in Bangalore.

References

External links
 

Olympic field hockey players of India
Asian Games medalists in field hockey
Field hockey players at the 1962 Asian Games
1938 births
1992 deaths
Field hockey players from Bangalore
Indian male field hockey players
Medalists at the 1968 Summer Olympics
Medalists at the 1964 Summer Olympics
Field hockey players at the 1964 Summer Olympics
Field hockey players at the 1968 Summer Olympics
Asian Games silver medalists for India
Olympic gold medalists for India
Olympic bronze medalists for India
Medalists at the 1962 Asian Games
Olympic medalists in field hockey